The 2017 FIG Artistic Gymnastics World Cup series was a series of stages where events in men's and women's artistic gymnastics were contested.

World Cup stages

Men's medalists

Women's medalists

See also
 2017 FIG Rhythmic Gymnastics World Cup series

References

Artistic Gymnastics World Cup
2017 in gymnastics